La búsqueda is a Mexican telenovela produced by Ernesto Alonso for Telesistema Mexicano in 1966.

Cast 
Susana Freyre as Irene Lagos
Rosario Gálvez
Enrique Rambal

References

External links 

Mexican telenovelas
1966 telenovelas
Televisa telenovelas
Spanish-language telenovelas
1966 Mexican television series debuts
1966 Mexican television series endings